Comprehension may refer to:

 Comprehension (logic), the totality of intensions, that is, properties or qualities, that an object possesses
 Comprehension approach, several methodologies of language learning that emphasize understanding language rather than speaking
 Comprehension axiom, an axiom in Zermelo–Fraenkel set theory in mathematics
 List comprehension, an adaptation of mathematical set notation to represent infinite lists in computer science
 Reading comprehension, a measurement of the understanding of a passage of text
 Understanding, ability to think about and to deal adequately with an idea

See also
 Comprehensive (disambiguation)